Prodoxus aenescens is a moth of the family Prodoxidae. In North America it is found in central-southern cismontane California, north-western Arizona and Baja California Norte. The habitat consists of coastal chaparral and montane dry shrubby grassland.

The wingspan is 9–15 mm. The forewings are uniformly brownish gray, with a bronzy luster. The hindwings are the same color, but lightly scaled.

The larvae feed on Yucca whipplei. They feed primarily in the apical portion of the inflorescence stalk.

References

Moths described in 1881
Prodoxidae